Juan Carlos Cárdenas (25 July 1945 – 30 March 2022) was an Argentine football player and coach. He played for a number of clubs in Argentina and Mexico as well as playing for the Argentina national team. He was known by the nickname "El Chango" which was a common name for people from the north of Argentina.

Club career
Cárdenas was spotted in 1962 by Racing Club de Avellaneda playing as a teenager for Unión de Santiago del Estero. He spent one year in the Argentine 2nd Division with Nueva Chicago before joining Racing Club in 1964. He was part of the championship winning team of 1966. In 1967, he helped the club to win the Copa Libertadores and later that year he scored the decisive goal against Celtic in the Copa Intercontinental to make Racing Club the first Argentine club to become club champions of the world.

In 1972 Cárdenas moved to Mexico where he played for Camoteros de Puebla and Tiburones Rojos de Veracruz returning to Racing Club in 1976.

Coaching career
After retiring as a player Cárdenas became the manager of several lower league teams in Argentina, including All Boys, Deportivo Armenio and General Lamadrid (being champion in this last one in 1977).

Honours
Racing Club
 Copa Intercontinental: 1967
 Copa Libertadores: 1967
 Primera División Argentina: 1966

References

External links

 

1945 births
2022 deaths
People from Santiago del Estero
Argentine footballers
Association football forwards
Argentina international footballers
Argentine Primera División players
Liga MX players
Nueva Chicago footballers
Racing Club de Avellaneda footballers
Club Puebla players
C.D. Veracruz footballers
Argentine football managers
Argentine expatriate footballers
Argentine expatriate sportspeople in Mexico
Expatriate footballers in Mexico
Sportspeople from Santiago del Estero Province